Greg Schneider is a professor of religion and social science at Pacific Union College in Angwin, California, United States. In 2005, he was the Walter C. Utt Visiting Professor of History at Pacific Union College.

Schneider received his bachelor's degree from then-Columbia Union College in 1971. He went on to the University of Chicago where he received his master's degree in 1973 and his doctorate in 1981.

He is active within the American Academy of Religion and has served on the steering committees of two program units. He won a year-long Fellowship from the National Endowment for the Humanities in 1985.

Schneider serves as the faculty sponsor for Pacific Union College's chapter of Amnesty International.

References

Pacific Union College faculty
University of Chicago alumni
Living people
Year of birth missing (living people)